Tikhoretsk is a town in Krasnodar Krai, Russia. It is the administrative center of the Tikhoretsky urban settlement and the Tikhoretsky District of the Krasnodar Territory. Population: 57,098 (2020),

Administrative and municipal status
Within the framework of administrative divisions, Tikhoretsk serves as the administrative center of Tikhoretsky District, even though it is not a part of it. As an administrative division, it is, together with the territory of Prigorodnensky Rural Okrug (which comprises two rural localities), incorporated separately as the Town of Tikhoretsk—an administrative unit with the status equal to that of the districts. As a municipal division, the Town of Tikhoretsk is incorporated within Tikhoretsky Municipal District as Tikhoretskoye Urban Settlement.

Transportation
The town is an important part of the southern rail network. Tikhoretsk (air base), a Russian Air Force base is nearby.

References

Notes

Sources

1874 establishments in the Russian Empire
Cities and towns in Krasnodar Krai
Populated places established in 1874